Terrance Michael "T. M." Wright (September 9, 1947 – October 31, 2015) was an American author best known as a writer of horror fiction, speculative fiction, and poetry.  He wrote more than 25 novels as well as novellas and short stories, over 40 years. His novels were translated into many different languages around the world. His works were reviewed by Kirkus Reviews, Publishers Weekly, Library Journal, Booklist, and many genre magazines.

Life and career
Wright's first publication was the non-fiction study of unidentified flying objects, entitled The Intelligent Man's Guide to Flying Saucers in 1968 for AS Barnes.  Strange Seed had five foreign editions.

His seventh novel, A Manhattan Ghost Story, has had 14 foreign editions and was optioned to be filmed in the 1980s.  A screenplay was written by Ronald Bass for which he was paid two million US dollars, a record-breaking amount for an adaptation of a novel to the screen. The option was taken over by Robert Lawrence Productions in 1991, and then exercised in 1993.  Many actors and directors have been attached to the project over the years including Wayne Wang, Julia Roberts, and Sharon Stone (who received five million US dollars because of her pay or play contract). As of 2015, the film is in development at Touchstone Pictures.

Wright's fiction appeared in several magazines including Twilight Zone Magazine, PostScripts, Cemetery Dance, Flesh and Blood Magazine, UpState,  and Brutarian.

Wright had painted book covers and he created illustrations for magazines including Brutarian.  He did the artwork for his own book covers of two foreign editions of Cold House (German and Italian language editions), The Eyes of the Carp from Cemetery Dance Publications in 2005, Blue Canoe from PS Publishing, Sleepeasy (from Leisure Books), and his collection Bone Soup from Cemetery Dance Publications.

In 2004, T. M. Wright was the judge for the inaugural Anubis Awards by Jeff Schwaner (owner of Broken Umbrella Press).  He spent the last years of his life in a Corning, New York nursing home living with Parkinson's disease. Has wife, Roxane A. White-Wright lives in Corning, also. T.M. Wright died October 31, 2015 according to PalMac in Memoriam Facebook Page.

Selected bibliography

Novels and novellas
The Woman Next Door (Playboy Press, 1981 and Tor Books, 1990) 
The Playground (Tor Books, 1982)
Carlisle Street (1983)
The Island (1988)
The Place (1989)
The School (1990)
Boundaries (1990)
The Last Vampire (1991)
Little Boy Lost (1992)
Cold House (Catalyst Press, 2003) (featuring an introduction by Jack Ketchum)
The House on Orchid Street (2003)
Visiting the Edge (2004) (a collection)
The Eyes of the Carp (Cemetery Dance Publications, 2005) (a novella) 
I Am the Bird (2006) (a novella)
Blue Canoe (2008)
Sally Pinup (2010) (a novella)

Ryerson Biergarten series
Series of novels featuring a detective named Ryerson Biergarten:
The Changing (as F. W. Armstrong) (Tor Books, 1985)
The Devouring (as F. W. Armstrong) (Tor Books, 1987) 
Goodlow's Ghosts (1992)
The Ascending (1994)
Sleepeasy (Victor Gollancz 1993, Leisure, 2001) (connected, but not a direct sequel)

Strange Seed series
Strange Seed (Everest House, NYC, 1978) (revised in 2005 for a limited hardcover re-release by Etwisted Publishing)
Nursery Tale (Playboy Press, 1982)
Children of the Island (Jove, 1983)
The People of the Dark  (1984)
Erthmun / Laughing Man (1995/2005) (originally released as Erthmun in 1995)

A Manhattan Ghost Story series
A Manhattan Ghost Story (1984, revised for Telos Publishing Ltd. in 2006)
The Waiting Room (1986)
A Spider on My Tongue (Nyx Books, 2006)

Short stories
"His Mother’s Eyes," published in Twilight Zone Magazine, June, 1988) and The Sterling Web (Winter, 1991)
"The House Under the Street" AKA "A World Without Toys," Upstate magazine (October 26, 1986), Shadows #10, edited by Charles L. Grant (Doubleday, 1987), The Year's Best Fantasy: First Annual Collection, edited by Ellen Datlow and Terri Windling (St. Martin's Press, 1988), Demons and Dreams, edited by Ellen Datlow and Terri Windling (Legend, 1989)  
"Circularity," Cemetery Dance (#37, 2002)
"The Marybell Women," Cemetery Dance (#47, 2003)
"The Screamers at the Window," Shivers IV (anthology) edited by Richard Chizmar (May 2006, Cemetery Dance Publications)
"Murder Victim," Midnight Premiere (anthology) edited by Tom Piccirilli (June 2007, Cemetery Dance Publications)
"Rainy Day People" Postscripts #10 (2007)
"Fog Boy," Darkness on the Edge: Tales Inspired by the Songs of Bruce Springsteen (anthology) edited by Harrison Howe (2010, PS Publishing)
"A Moment at the House" The New and Perfect Man/Postscripts #24/25 (2011)

Chapbooks
"The People on the Island" (Bandersnatch Books, 2010)
unnamed release (Bandersnatch Books, 2010)
unnamed release (Bandersnatch Books, 2010)

Short story collections
Bone Soup (a collection of short stories, art, poems, and revised version of the novel Cold House) (Cemetery Dance Publications, scheduled 2010) Featuring:
Cold House (a revised version of the novel of the same name)
"The People on the Island"
"His Mother's Eyes"
"Rainy Day People"
"Tower Man"
poems
artwork
and more...

Non-fiction
The Intelligent Man's Guide to Flying Saucers (AS Barnes, 1968)

Other publications
"Stuff of Horror, or Gray Matter All Over the Inside of Your Skull",  article for American Fantasy (Summer, 1987)
By Reason of Darkness (2004), by William P. Simmons (contains an afterword by T. M. Wright)

Interviews
"A Conversation with T. M. Wright," interview by Douglas A. Anderson for 2AM (Summer, 1989)
"Tall Tales from a Master," interview by Susan M. Burdorf for The Sterling Web (Winter, 1991)
"A Conversation with T. M. Wright" interview by William P. Simmons for Cemetery Dance (#37, 2002)
"An Interview with T. M. Wright" interview by James R. Beach for Dark Discoveries #9 (Winter, 2007)
"An Interview with T. M. Wright" interview by Scott Colbert for Talkbacker.com website, October, 2013
"Interview with T. M. Wright" interview by Matt Cardin at Demon Muse (May 2010). Republished at The Teeming Brain (June 2014)

References

External links
 Bibliography on FanasticFiction.co.uk
 Bibliography on T. M. Wright official homepage. Archived from the original on 2009-10-06
 

1947 births
2015 deaths
20th-century American novelists
21st-century American novelists
American horror writers
American illustrators
American male novelists
American male short story writers
Horror artists
People from Honeoye, New York
20th-century American short story writers
21st-century American short story writers
20th-century American male writers
21st-century American male writers